Bø is a municipality in Nordland county, Norway. It is part of the Vesterålen region. The administrative centre of the municipality is the village of Straume. Other villages in the municipality include Auvåg, the village of Bø, Eidet, Guvåg, Hovden, Klakksjorda, Malnes, Nykvåg, Utskor, and Vågen. The Litløy Lighthouse is located on the tiny island of Litløya off the coast of Bø.

The  municipality is the 288th largest by area out of the 356 municipalities in Norway. Bø is the 248th most populous municipality in Norway with a population of 2,565.

General information

The municipality of Bø was established on 1 January 1838 (see formannskapsdistrikt law). On 1 January 1866, a small area of the neighboring Øksnes Municipality (population: 40) was transferred to Bø. On 1 January 1964, the Kråkberget village and the peninsula north of Kråkberget (population: 271) was transferred from the neighboring municipality of Øksnes to Bø.

Name
The municipality (originally the parish) is named after the old Bø farm (Old Norse: Bœr), since the first Bø Church was built there. The name is identical with the word bœr which means "farm" and it is a cognate with the Dutch language word "boer" which means "farmer".

Coat of arms
The coat of arms was granted on 7 August 1987. The official blazon is "Sable, a demi-boat argent with a mast and a square sail". This means the arms have a black field (background) and the charge is a half-boat with a mast and a square sail. The boat has a tincture of argent which means it is commonly colored white, but if it is made out of metal, then silver is used. This was chosen to represent the importance of fishing in Bø, but also reminiscent of some old legends/fairy tales in the region that include a "half boat". (The sea ghost draugr travelled in a half boat.) The arms were designed by Rolf Tidemann.

Churches
The Church of Norway has one parish within the municipality of Bø. It is part of the Vesterålen prosti (deanery) in the Diocese of Sør-Hålogaland.

Population
The municipality has sustained a steady decline in population since the 1950s when 6,122 people lived in Bø. The 2001 census showed that the population had declined to 3,156, while the fourth quarter population estimate for 2007 showed the population at 2866. The bureau of statistics projects a continued population decline.

The municipality has 73 gårdsnummer in the cadastre. The largest and densest population center is the Vinje, Skagen, and Steine area in the southwestern part of the municipality, which is designated as the village of "Bø" by Statistics Norway.

Government
All municipalities in Norway, including Bø, are responsible for primary education (through 10th grade), outpatient health services, senior citizen services, unemployment and other social services, zoning, economic development, and municipal roads. The municipality is governed by a municipal council of elected representatives, which in turn elect a mayor.  The municipality falls under the Vesterålen District Court and the Hålogaland Court of Appeal.

Taxation
In 2020, the municipality announced a reduction in its wealth tax, creating a tax shelter unique in Norway, in order to encourage population growth. The state charges a .85% wealth tax on an individual's global assets above 1.5 million Norwegian kroner. Of this .15% goes to the state, and the remaining .7% goes to the individual's municipality of residence. Bø announced that, from January 2021, it would reduce its stake to just from .7% to .2%, and thus reducing the tax collected from .85% to .35%.

Municipal council
The municipal council of Bø is made up of 19 representatives that are elected to four year terms. The party breakdown of the council is as follows:

Geography
The municipality of Bø lies on the island of Langøya and many small surrounding islets including Litløya and Gaukværøy.

Climate
Bø has a subpolar oceanic climate, and is close to a temperate oceanic climate. Bø is the northernmost location in the world with all monthly means above . The current weather station is on the south coast of the island.

Attractions

Man from the Sea
The man is holding a crystal in his hands like a sacrifice to the sea. In the winter light, the crystal turns blue. The man stands with his back to the village of Bø, and looks out over the craggy archipelago towards the distinctive silhouette of Gaukværøya island.

Notatble people
 Regine Normann (1867 in Bø – 1939) a Norwegian school teacher, novelist and story writer
 Ketil Vea (1932 in Bø – 2015) a Norwegian composer and pedagogue
 Grethe Gynnild Johnsen (born 1959 in Bø) Norwegian journalist, director of all regional offices for NRK
 Bjørn Dæhlie (born 1967) a champion skier, intends to move to Bø for tax reasons

References

External links
Municipal fact sheet from Statistics Norway 

 
Municipalities of Nordland
Populated places of Arctic Norway
Vesterålen
1838 establishments in Norway
Tax avoidance